Shek Lung Tsai New Village is a village in Sai Kung District, Hong Kong.

Administration
Shek Lung Tsai New Village is a recognized village under the New Territories Small House Policy.

See also
 Shek Lung Tsai

References

Villages in Sai Kung District, Hong Kong